Almeda Mall is a shopping mall located in the Southeast Houston neighborhood of Genoa on Interstate 45. The mall opened in 1968. The anchor stores are Macy's, dd's DISCOUNTS, and Burlington. There is 1 vacant anchor store that was once Palais Royal.

The mall has  in leasable space.

History
Almeda Mall was constructed in 1968, but the Foley's (now Macy's) had arrived two years earlier in the spring of 1966 and JCPenney was the other original anchor. Almeda was the premiere mall for the area southeast of Houston until 1978 when Baybrook Mall opened a few exits south, much closer to the affluent Clear Lake/NASA area. Baybrook quickly replaced Almeda as the area's highly successful mall. The mall also received a much bigger decline in the 2000's as Pearland began to receive openings of major retailers in along 288 and the opening of the Pearland Town Center in 2008. Around 2017, the mall underwent a million dollar renovation project, replacing the old brown brick flooring and walls.

In 2006, the mall was about 95% occupied. During that year Glimcher Realty Trust put the mall up for sale, along with the Northwest Mall, which was purchased by WCF Mall Management, but then permanently closed in March 2017. JCPenney closed in 2006 and relocated to 
Pasadena, TX. Burlington Coat Factory took its spot. In 2006, Foley's rebranded to Macy's after its acquisition by The May Department Stores Company in 2005.

Palais Royal closed in 2019.

References

External links
 

Kohan Retail Investment Group
Shopping malls in Houston
Shopping malls established in 1966